Jonah Reinhard Fabisch (born 13 August 2001) is a footballer who plays as a midfielder for German Regionalliga team Hamburger SV II. Born in Kenya, he plays for the Zimbabwe national team.

Club career
Fabisch joined youth academy of Hamburger SV in 2012. He made his debut for club's reserve team on 6 September 2020 in a 1–1 draw against Lüneburger SK Hansa.

International career
Fabisch is eligible to represent Kenya, Germany and Zimbabwe at international level. He has played for DFB's under-17 and under-19 perspektivteams in 2018 and 2019.

In August 2021, Fabisch was named in Zimbabwe squad for World Cup qualifying matches against South Africa and Ethiopia. He made his international debut on 14 November 2021 in a 1–1 draw against Ethiopia.

Personal life
Fabisch was born in Kenya to a German father and a Zimbabwean Shona mother. His father Reinhard was a football manager and have coached national teams of Kenya and Zimbabwe. His mother Chawada Kachidza is a former national 100 metres hurdles record holder.

Career statistics

Club

International

References

External links
 
 

2001 births
Living people
Sportspeople from Nairobi
Association football midfielders
Zimbabwean footballers
Zimbabwe international footballers
Kenyan footballers
Zimbabwean people of German descent
Kenyan people of Zimbabwean descent
Kenyan people of German descent
Regionalliga players
Hamburger SV II players